Scirpophaga xanthopygata is a species of moth in the family Crambidae. It is found in Russia, Ukraine, Korea, eastern China, Japan, Vietnam and Taiwan.

The wingspan is 22–41 mm for males and 23–47 mm for females. The upperside of the forewings is pale ochreous white while the underside is fuscous. The upperside of the hindwings is pale also ochreous white, but the underside is suffused with fuscous in the costal half.

References

Moths described in 1922
Schoenobiinae
Moths of Asia